The Man with the Golden Gun is the soundtrack for the ninth James Bond film of the same name.

The theme tune was performed by Lulu, composed by John Barry - returning to the series after a one film absence (George Martin had scored the preceding film Live and Let Die), and the lyrics to the song were written by Don Black. Alice Cooper claims his song "Man with the Golden Gun" was to be used by the film's producers until it was dropped for Lulu's song instead. Cooper's song appears on the album Muscle of Love.

Barry considered the theme tune – the only Bond film title track not to chart as a single in either the UK or U.S. – and score to be among the weakest of his contributions to the series: "It's the one I hate most... it just never happened for me." Certainly the title song is notable for having suggestive lyrics, and during a TV celebration for the series' 40th anniversary, Lulu's performance was introduced with reference to its being the raunchiest of all Bond songs. For the first time, the song's end theme is not a straight reprise of the opener, as it begins with different lyrics (subsequent films followed suit with variations in arrangement, ahead of a new practice of using a different song altogether). Some Bond music fans consider Lulu's brassy vocal to be effective in setting the tone for the film's female characters.

Barry's score for the film has stylistic similarities to that of Diamonds Are Forever - which had marked a gradual transition away from the heavy horn based sound of his 1960s Bond scores to a smoother, string based sound.  The film was also the first to drop the distinctive plucked guitar from the Bond theme heard over the gun barrel sequence - in all subsequent John Barry James Bond scores, this theme would be heard on strings and trumpet. Not present on the album but heard in the film is a brief reprise, for recognition purposes, of the song "Live and Let Die" when a character (Sheriff JW Pepper) from the previous film reappears. The next three Bond films would wittily feature excerpts from the familiar music of other films, too (though classics rather than Bond films), while On Her Majesty's Secret Service had included a janitor character whistling the theme from Goldfinger as an in-joke.

The popular song "Mindfields" by The Prodigy (released on The Fat of the Land) features a specific part of "Hip's Trip". Barry gave the band permission to do so.

Track listing
Composer, except as noted, is John Barry.
 "The Man with the Golden Gun (Main Title)" (J. Barry/D. Black) – Lulu
 "Scaramanga's Fun House"
 "Chew Me in Grisly Land"
 "The Man with the Golden Gun (Jazz Instrumental)"
 "Getting the Bullet"
 "Goodnight Goodnight"
 "Let's Go Get 'Em"
 "Hip's Trip"
 "Kung Fu Fight"
 "In Search of Scaramanga's Island"
 "Return to Scaramanga's Fun House"
 "The Man With the Golden Gun (End Title)" (J. Barry/D. Black) – Lulu

See also
 Outline of James Bond

References

Soundtrack albums from James Bond films
Soundtrack
1974 soundtrack albums
EMI Records soundtracks
John Barry (composer) soundtracks